Gers (or) is a department in the region of Occitania, Southwestern France. Named after the Gers River, its inhabitants are called the Gersois and Gersoises in French. In 2019, it had a population of 191,377.

History
In the Middle Ages, the Lordship of L'Isle-Jourdain was nearby.

Gers is one of the original 83 departments created during the French Revolution on 4 March 1790. It was created from parts of the former provinces of Guyenne and Gascony. It is surrounded by the departments of Hautes-Pyrénées, Haute-Garonne, Tarn-et-Garonne, Lot-et-Garonne, Landes and Pyrénées-Atlantiques. In 1808 it lost Lavit on its north-eastern side to the newly created department of Tarn-et-Garonne.

Culture
The culture is largely agricultural, with great emphasis on the local gastronomical specialties such as:

 Armagnac brandy;
 Côtes de Gascogne;
 Floc de Gascogne;
 Foie gras;
 Wild mushrooms.

Also, some prominent cultivated crops are corn, colza, sunflowers and grain.

The Gascon language is a dialect of Occitan, but it is not widely spoken. The department is characterised by sleepy bastide villages and rolling hills with the Pyrenees visible to the south. Alexandre Dumas, père created the famous Gersois d'Artagnan, the fourth musketeer of The Three Musketeers.  A museum to d'Artagnan is found in the Gersois village of Lupiac.

A horse race at the Auteuil Hippodrome has been named after André Boingnères, a notable local race-horse owner and the successful Mayor of Termes-d'Armagnac between 1951 and 1976.

Politics

Departmental Council of Gers
The President of the Departmental Council of Gers is Philippe Dupouy of the Socialist Party since 2022. He succeeded Philippe Martin, who had been in office since 2014. The assembly comprises 34 seats, allocated as follow since the 2015 departmental elections:

Members of the National Assembly
Gers elected the following members of the National Assembly during the 2017 legislative election:

Demography

Located in Southwestern France, Gers is often referred to as amongst the least densely populated (30.5 people/km2 in 2016), least urban, or most rural, areas in all of Western Europe. List of the 10 most populous communes of the department:

Climate

The annual rain varies from more than 900 mm in the south-west of the department, to less than 700 mm in the North-East (Auch, Condom, Lectoure).

The winters vary, with only occasional freezing temperatures, but the climate remains mild and dry. The amount of sunshine is about 1950 hours/years.

The summers are hot and dry. Auch is, together with Toulouse, Nîmes, Carpentras, Ajaccio, Marseille, Toulon and Perpignan, one of the hottest cities in France.

Tourism

According to recent data tourism represents annually:
 610 000 tourists,
 5.900.000 nights,
 22.100 commercial beds,
 2 400 paid employment related to tourism,
 the tourist represent an equivalent of 17.100 permanent inhabitants,
 their estimated expenditure is €141.000.000 .

See also
Cantons of the Gers department
Communes of the Gers department
Arrondissements of the Gers department

References

External links

  Departmental Council website
  Prefecture website
 Welcome to the Gers in Gascony Tourisme Gers - Vos vacances en France dans le Gers, coeur du Sud Ouest et de l'Occitanie

 
1790 establishments in France
Departments of Occitania (administrative region)
States and territories established in 1790